Walter Sweeney may refer to:
 Walter Sweeney (politician) (born 1949), British politician
 Walter C. Sweeney Jr. (1909–1965), United States Air Force general
 Walter C. Sweeney Sr. (1876–1963), United States Army general
 Walt Sweeney (1941–2013), American football player